Ungen (The Child or The Kid) is a Norwegian drama film from 1938 directed by Rasmus Breistein. The lead roles are played by Eva Sletto, Harald Heide Steen, and Ragnhild Hald. It is a film adaptation of Oskar Braaten's 1911 play Ungen: folkeliv i fire akter (The Child: Everyday Life in Four Acts). A new version of the film was made in 1974 as a musical.

Plot
Julius and Milja are in love with each other and they also work at the same factory. Petrina, a girl from Oslo's Grønland neighborhood, flirts with Julius and tricks him into stealing from the factory, which causes him to be fired. A year passes, and Julius has left Milja for Petrina. Milja has had a child and during the day, when she works, she leaves the child with Hønse-Lovisa. A doctor, who has been sent out by rich people to find children to adopt, persuades Milja to give away her child. After she has given her child up, she realizes what she has done and becomes desperate. However, Hønse-Lovisa does not think it was a wise decision to give up the child and has therefore kept the child with her. When Milja returns after a night of dancing, she finds the child at home.

Cast
 Eva Sletto as Milja
 Harald Heide Steen as Julius
 Ragnhild Hald as Hønse-Lovisa
 Tove Bryn as Petrina
 Astrid Sommer as Krestena
 Agnethe Schibsted-Hansson as Gurina
 Hans Bille as the doctor
 Hauk Aabel as Krestoffer
 Martin Gisti as Engebret
 Liv Uchermann Selmer as Lagreta, Julius's mother
 Signe Ramberg as Olina
 Maj Nielsen-Sæther as Sergeant Petra
 Ellinor Borg as a patient in the waiting room
 Ellen Bugge as a patient in the waiting room
 Bjarne Bø as a patient in the waiting room
 Helge Essmar as Olaf
 Marie Hedemark as a working woman
 Joachim Holst-Jensen as a waiter
 Ole Leikvang as a patient in the waiting room
 Kirsten Monrad-Aas as a woman from the West End
 Pehr Qværnstrøm as a restaurateur
 Guri Stormoen as a patient in the waiting room
 Jan Vaage as a patient in the waiting room
 Kåre Wicklundas Elias
 Alfred Helgeby as the milkman
 Sonja Marie Bakkely as the child

References

External links
 
 Ungen at the National Library of Norway

Norwegian drama films
Norwegian films based on plays
Norwegian black-and-white films
1930s Norwegian-language films
1938 drama films
1938 films
Films directed by Rasmus Breistein